The 2017 Slovenian Football Cup was the final match of the 2016–17 Slovenian Football Cup to decide the winner of the 26th edition of the Slovenian Football Cup, Slovenia's top knockout tournament. It was played on 31 May 2017 at Bonifika Stadium in Koper and was won by Domžale, who defeated Olimpija Ljubljana, winning their second cup title.

Background
The final was played between Domžale and Olimpija Ljubljana, both competing in the Slovenian PrvaLiga. This was the first time that Domžale and Olimpija met in the cup final. Domžale previously competed in two finals, winning the competition once, when they defeated Maribor in the 2010–11 edition. Olimpija never competed in the cup final since the club's establishment in 2005.

Road to the final

Note: In all results below, the score of the finalist is given first.

Match details

See also
2016–17 Slovenian Football Cup
2016–17 Slovenian PrvaLiga

References

Cup
Slovenian Football Cup finals
Slovenian Football Cup Final 2017